Peach Street Distillers is a privately owned, self-proclaimed “artisanal,” professional brewery and distillery in Palisade, Colorado. Established in November 2005 by Rory Donovan with Bill Graham and David Thibodeau, co-founders of Ska Brewing Company in Durango, Colorado.

The company is best known for their Goat Vodka and Jackelope Gin.

History 

Rory Donovan, Bill Graham and David Thibodeau, who were friends prior to founding the distillery, began the company with years of professional brewing and distilling experience between them.  They chose Palisade, located at 4,700 feet elevation for their liquor-making hub.

Head distiller Davy Lindig makes bourbon from Olathe sweet corn, fruit brandies from the area's pears, plums and peaches; and grappas in partnership with Debeque Canyon Winery, from Gewürztraminer and Viognier grapes.

Camaraderie in the industry is intended to boost sales and in the hope of making Colorado the epicenter of microdistilleries.

Palisade 

Palisade, a town of just 2,500 people, produces a variety of fruits including cherries, apricots, pears and grapes. Hence, it is fitting that each September, the region hosts Colorado's Mountain Winefest, in which wine makers from around the state pour their newest blends and brews for thousands of attendees.

Microdistillery trends across Colorado 

The proliferation of microdistilleries  such as Peach Street Distillers is part of a growing trend across Colorado. Companies such as Leopold Bros., Stranahan's Colorado Whiskey, and Roundhouse Liquors have gained notoriety by filling a niche market for locally owned and operated liquor, a byproduct of Colorado's brewery and microbrewery culture, as well as its locavore tendencies.  The state is now home to 13 craft distilleries.

Craft distilleries often require considerable initial investments, both with regard to aging time and financial difficulties presented by competition with larger liquor brands.  However, with the creation of the Colorado Distiller's Guild, small licensed distilling companies now have an outlet to promote their interests.  Relations are amicable between local brands; for instance, Stranahan's and Peach Street order their barrels together.

Awards 

American Distilling Institute: Peach Street Distillers dominated the Varietal Grappa category, winning Gold for their Gerwurtz-traminer grappa and a Bronze for their Muscat.  The company also took a silver medal in both the Peach and Pear Eau de Vie categories, as well as for their peach brandy.

Products 

The company produces a variety of spirits that are available across Colorado.  The company's Goat Vodka and Jackelope Gin are also available in Oregon, California and Kansas.

The product list consists of: 

Colorado Straight Bourbon
Colorado Straight Bourbon 5 Year
Colorado Straight Bourbon Barrell Strength
Colorado Straight Peach Infused Bourbon
Colorado Straight Bourbon 10 Year
Colorado Straight Bourbon Bonded
Ska Modus Hoperandi Hop Flavored Whiskey
American Peated Single Malt Whiskey
American Peated Single Malt Whiskey 8 Year
Smoked Rye Whiskey
Colorado Straight Rye
Jackelope Gin
Jackelope and Jenny Gin with Pear Spirits
Jackelope Barreled Gin
Jackelope and Jenny Barreled Gin with Pear Spirits
Goat Artisan Vodka
D’Agave Silver
D’Agave Gold
D’Agave Extra
Amaro
Peach Brandy Eau De Vie
Plum Brandy Eau De Vie
Pear Brandy Eau De Vie
Cherry Brandy Eau De Vie
Apricot Brandy Eau De Vie
Grappa of Gewurztraminer
Grappa of Viognier
Grappa Muscat
Peach Brandy
Peach Brandy XO Edition
Pear Brandy
Pear Brandy XO Edition

See also 
Cuisine of the Western United States
Stranahan's Colorado Whiskey
Leopold Bros.
Gin

References

External links 
 Peach Street Distillers Website

Companies based in Colorado
American companies established in 2005
Distilleries in Colorado
Food and drink companies established in 2005